Rigomagno is a village in Tuscany, central Italy, administratively a frazione of the comune of Sinalunga, Province of Siena. At the time of the 2001 census its population was 144.

References 

Frazioni of Sinalunga